Temptation is a 2007 Russian drama film directed by Sergey Ashkenazi.

Plot 
Andrei's stepbrother, whom he saw only once, died. Andrew is trying to understand the cause of his brother’s death. Was it an accident or suicide?

Cast 
 Sergey Makovetsky as Igor
 Ekaterina Fedulova as Genya
 Ilya Iosifov as Sasha
 Svetlana Ivanova as Anya
 Ivan Stebunov as Andrey

References

External links 
 

2007 films
2000s Russian-language films
Russian drama films
2007 drama films